Pshizov is a rural locality (an aul) in Khatazhukayskoye Rural Settlement of Shovgenovsky District, the Republic of Adygea, Russia. The population was 845 as of 2018. There are 20 streets.

Geography 
Pshizov is located south of the Laba River, 15 km northwest of Khakurinokhabl (the district's administrative centre) by road. Vesyoly is the nearest rural locality.

Ethnicity 
The aul is inhabited by Circassians.

References 

Rural localities in Shovgenovsky District